I Refuse may refer to:

 "I Refuse", a 2001 song by Aaliyah from Aaliyah
 "I Refuse", a 2016 song by Simple Plan from Taking One for the Team